Jacopo Desogus (born 1 October 2002) is an Italian professional footballer, who plays for  club Pescara, on loan from Cagliari, as a winger.

Club career
Born in Cagliari and raised in the near town of Gergei, Desogus joined Cagliari's academy in 2012. After coming through the youth ranks of the club, he made his professional debut on 15 December 2021, coming in a substitute for Charalampos Lykogiannis in a 3–1 Coppa Italia win over Cittadella. He subsequently signed his first professional contract with the club on 13 January 2022, penning a four-year deal.

On 13 August 2022, he made his league debut for Cagliari, starting the Serie B match against Como, which ended in a 1-1 draw.

On 1 September 2022, Desogus joined Serie C club Pescara on a season-long loan, as part of a deal that saw Davide Veroli go in the opposite direction. On 11 December, he scored his first professional goal in a 1-2 league win over Monopoli.

International career 
Desogus has been a youth international for Italy, having played for the under-20 national team.

Style of play 
Desogus is a right-footed winger, who primarily plays on the left side, but can also operate in several other attacking positions. A quick dribbler, he's also good both technically and athletically, which allows him to be prolific both as a goalscorer and as an assist-man.

References

External links
 
 Lega Serie A Profile

2002 births
Living people
Sportspeople from Cagliari
Sportspeople from Sardinia
Italian footballers
Italy youth international footballers
Cagliari Calcio players
Delfino Pescara 1936 players
Association football wingers